Maria José Rodriguez-Salgado (born 1955) is professor of international history at the London School of Economics. Rodriguez-Salgado is a specialist in 16th and 17th century Europe, Elizabeth Tudor, Philip II, Charles V, and Anglo-Spanish relations. With the staff of the National Maritime Museum she curated and wrote the guide to their exhibition Armada.

Selected publications
The Changing Face of Empire: Charles V, Philip II and Habsburg Authority 1551-1559. Cambridge University Press, Cambridge, 1988.
Armada. The Official Catalogue of the National Maritime Museum Exhibition. Penguin Books, London, 1988. (With contributions from the staff of the National Maritime Museum)
England, Spain and the Gran Armada, 1585-1604. Essays from the Anglo-Spanish Conferences London and Madrid 1988. John Donald, Edinburgh, 1991. (Edited with Dr. Simon Adams)
Felipe II. El "Paladín de la Cristiandad" y la Paz con el Turco. Salamanca, 2004.

References 

Academics of the London School of Economics
Living people
British historians
1955 births